Vanessa Williams (born March 18, 1963) is an American actress and singer. In 1988, Williams released her debut album, The Right Stuff. The first single, "The Right Stuff", found success on the R&B chart, while the second single, "He's Got the Look", found similar success on the same chart. The third single, "Dreamin'", was a pop hit, becoming Williams's first top 10 hit on the Billboard Hot 100, peaking at No. 8, and her first number one single on the Hot R&B/Hip-Hop Songs chart. The album reached gold status in the US and earned her an NAACP Image Award and three Grammy Award nominations, including one for Best New Artist.

Her second album The Comfort Zone became the biggest success in her music career. The lead single "Running Back to You" reached top twenty on the Hot 100, and the top position of Hot R&B/Hip-Hop Songs chart on October 5, 1991. Other singles included "The Comfort Zone" (#2 R&B), "Just for Tonight" (#26 Pop), a cover of The Isley Brothers' "Work to Do" (#3 R&B), and the club-only hit "Freedom Dance (Get Free!)". The most successful single from the album, as well as her biggest hit to date, is "Save the Best for Last". It reached No. 1 in the United States, where it remained for five weeks, as well as No. 1 in Australia, the Netherlands, and Canada, and was in the top 5 in Japan, Ireland and the United Kingdom. The album sold 2.2 million copies in the US at its time of release and has since been certified triple platinum in the United States by the RIAA, gold in Canada by the CRIA, and platinum in the United Kingdom by the BPI. The Comfort Zone earned Williams five Grammy Award nominations.

The Sweetest Days, her third album, was released in 1994 to highly-favorable reviews. The album saw Williams branch out and sample other styles of music that included jazz, hip hop, rock, and Latin-themed recordings such as "Betcha Never" and "You Can't Run", both written and produced by Babyface. Other singles from the album included the adult-contemporary and dance hit "The Way That You Love" and the title track "The Sweetest Days". The album was certified platinum in the US by the RIAA and earned her two Grammy Award nominations.

Other releases include two Christmas albums, Star Bright, released in 1996, and Silver & Gold in 2004; Next in 1997, and Everlasting Love in 2005, along with a greatest-hits compilation released in 1998, and a host of other compilations released over the years.
Notable chart performances from subsequent albums, motion picture and television soundtracks have included the songs "Love Is", which was a duet with Brian McKnight, the Golden Globe- and Academy Award-winning "Colors of the Wind", "Where Do We Go from Here?", and "Oh How the Years Go By".

On June 2, 2009, she released her eighth studio album on Concord Records titled The Real Thing. It features songs written and/or produced by Babyface, Stevie Wonder, Bill Withers, Bebel Gilberto, and Rex Rideout. Williams described the album as "a hybrid of samba, bossa nova, some salsa and also some pop and R&B." The title song "The Real Thing", the fourth single released from the album, peaked at No. 6 on the Billboard Hot Dance Club Songs chart.

She received a number of  Grammy nominations for her work in the music industry, including hits such as "The Right Stuff", "Save the Best for Last", "Colors of the Wind", and "Oh How the Years Go By".

Albums

Studio albums

 Peaked at No. 2 on the Billboard Gospel Albums chart and at No. 6 on the ARIA R&B Albums chart.
 Peaked at No. 1 on the Billboard Top Contemporary Jazz Albums chart and at No. 2 on the Billboard Top Jazz Albums chart.

Live albums

 Peaked at No. 2 on the Billboard Top Classical Crossover chart and at No. 25 on the Billboard Top Internet Albums chart.

Compilation albums

Singles

 A 1989 remix of the song charted at number 62 in the UK.
 Peaked at No. 3 on the Billboard Hot Latin Tracks chart and at No. 5 on the Billboard Tropical/Salsa Songs chart.
 Peaked at No. 10 on the Billboard Smooth Jazz Songs chart.

Featured singles

Other appearances

Video releases

Video albums

Concert videos

Music videos

See also
List of awards and nominations received by Vanessa L. Williams

References

External links
Vanessa Williams interview with Marcus Jones - Journalist Marcus Jones 1988 interview
"Miss America 1984 Vanessa Williams Interview with Bill Boggs" - Bill Boggs 1983 interview (includes music performance)

Vocal jazz discographies
Rhythm and blues discographies
Discographies of American artists
Discography
Soul music discographies